The Ministry of Industry, Energy and Mines or The Ministry of Industry''' for short, is a Tunisian ministry of industry.

Missions 
The ministry's mission is to develop and implement government policy in areas related to industry, agribusiness, services related to the industry, energy and mining cooperation industrial and industrial, energy and mining safety.

References 

Politics of Tunisia
Industry
Tunisia